Robert Charles Landry (born September 18, 1962) is a Canadian Champion jockey in thoroughbred horse racing.

Landry embarked on his career while in his teens, earning his first victory on June 21, 1981, at Fort Erie Racetrack. He went on to a stellar career as one of his country's top jockeys and in 1993 and 1994 was voted the Sovereign Award for Outstanding Jockey. In addition to numerous Graded stakes race wins, in 1998 Robert Landry won two of the three Canadian Classics. In 2004, he rode Niigon to victory in Canada's most prestigious race, the Queen's Plate.

In 2003, Landry was voted the Avelino Gomez Memorial Award, an annual honour given to a jockey in recognition of their significant contribution to the sport of Thoroughbred racing.

On July 1, 2009, Landry earned the 2000th win of his career at Woodbine Racetrack.

Outside racing
In addition to  volunteer work for various children's charities, Robert Landy has been an active supporter and a member of the board of directors of the LongRun Thoroughbred Retirement Society. The Rexdale organization is dedicated  to providing aged Thoroughbred racers with a permanent adoptive home or alternative careers as pleasure horses or companion animals.

Year-end charts

References

 Robert Landry at the NTRA
 Robert Landry at biography at Woodbine Entertainment Group

1962 births
Living people
Avelino Gomez Memorial Award winners
Canadian jockeys
Sportspeople from Toronto
Sovereign Award winners